The following is a list of notable machinima-related events in the year 2003.

Notable releases
 June 22—Fire Team Charlie Productions' Fire Team Charlie began with the premiere of the first episode.

Active series
 Fire Team Charlie (2003–2005)
 Red vs. Blue (2003–2007)
 Time Commanders (2003–2005)

Machinima
Machinima by year